Neil Ogden (born 29 November 1975 in Higher End, England) is an English former footballer. Neil retired football in 2006 to look after his children.

Children

Alexa Ogden (Born 2006)

Club career
Ogden was an apprentice at hometown club Wigan Athletic and made his Football League debut at Vetch Field on the 4 May 1993. After three seasons Ogden briefly played in the Football Conference and the Premier Soccer League before moving to Sligo Rovers in the summer of 1997 under Nicky Reid. He made his League of Ireland debut on the 30 August 1997. During that 1997-98 League of Ireland season, Sligo won their first ever FAI League Cup.

Ogden signed to the Shelbourne for the 1999-2000 League of Ireland season under Dermot Keely, and made his debut in the 1999 UEFA Intertoto Cup tie against Neuchâtel Xamax at the Stade de la Maladière (1924). However, after only 5 league appearances he moved to Galway United in November 1999. In January 2000, the Tribesmen knocked the defending League champions out of the FAI Cup and beat Sligo 5–0 with Ogden scoring.

Ogden signed for Portadown F.C. in the summer of 2000 and in his second season won the IFA Premiership. He made two appearances in the 2002–03 UEFA Champions League against FC Belshina Bobruisk At the end of the 2002–03 Irish League season, Ogden signed to Larne F.C. Under Jimmy McGeough, Larne reached the 2004–05 Irish Cup Final, where Ogden opened the scoring in a 5–1 loss. In November 2005, Ogden's contract at Inver Park was terminated by Kenny Shiels.

Honours
Irish League
 Portadown 2001/2002
Mid-Ulster Cup: 2
 Portadown 2001/2002, 2002/2003
League Cup
Sligo Rovers 1997/98

References

1975 births
Living people
English footballers
Wigan Athletic F.C. players
Northwich Victoria F.C. players
AmaZulu F.C. players
Sligo Rovers F.C. players
Shelbourne F.C. players
Galway United F.C. (1937–2011) players
Portadown F.C. players
Larne F.C. players
Association football defenders
English Football League players
National League (English football) players
League of Ireland players
NIFL Premiership players
Expatriate association footballers in the Republic of Ireland
Expatriate soccer players in South Africa